The 2008 Nordea Nordic Light Open was a women's tennis tournament played on outdoor hard courts. It was the 7th edition of the Nordea Nordic Light Open, and was part of the Tier IV Series of the 2008 WTA Tour. It took place in Stockholm, Sweden, from 28 July until 3 August 2008. Fourth-seeded Caroline Wozniacki won the singles title and earned $22,925 first-prize money.

Finals

Singles

 Caroline Wozniacki defeated  Vera Dushevina, 6–0, 6–2
It was Caroline Wozniacki's 1st career title.

Doubles

 Iveta Benešová /  Barbora Záhlavová-Strýcová defeated  Petra Cetkovská /  Lucie Šafářová, 7–5, 6–4

External links 
 
 ITF tournament edition details
 Tournament draws

Nordea Nordic Light Open
2008
2008 in Swedish women's sport
2000s in Stockholm
July 2008 sports events in Europe
August 2008 sports events in Europe
Nordic